Angelika Hilbert (born 3 December 1942) is a German diver. She competed at the 1964 Summer Olympics and the 1968 Summer Olympics.

References

1942 births
Living people
German female divers
Olympic divers of the United Team of Germany
Olympic divers of West Germany
Divers at the 1964 Summer Olympics
Divers at the 1968 Summer Olympics
Divers from Berlin
20th-century German women
21st-century German women